Tipacoque is a municipality and town in Boyacá Department, Colombia, located on the Altiplano Cundiboyacense, part of the Eastern Ranges of the Colombian Andes. Tipacoque is situated on the western flank of the Chicamocha river canyon. It is part of the Northern Boyacá Province.

Etymology 
Tipacoque is derived from Zipacoque, which in Chibcha means "dependency of the zaque", referring to the zaque rule of the village in the times of the Muisca Confederation, the loose confederation of rulers of the Muisca.

Geography and climate 
The total area of the municipality is 72 km². To the north it borders Covarachía and Capitanejo and to the south it borders Soatá. The Chicamocha River separates it from Capitanejo and Boavita in the east. Finally, a branch of the Eastern mountain range separates it from Onzaga (in Santander) in the west. This range varies from 1,200 meters at the base of the Chicamocha Canyon to over 3,000 meters at "Cruz de Roble".

Its average temperature is 18 °C (64.4 °F). The warmest months are December and January, when the temperature exceeds 25 °C. The  climate is predominantly dry.

The vegetation is varied. The fauna is composed mainly by mammal species like rabbits, armadillos and tinajos, which live in the higher altitudes. In the lowlands, reptiles predominate. The most common birds are garrapateros, hummingbirds, toches, turpiales, gurrias, doves, perdices, pregoneros and cuchicas, native species that can be found in the creeks which feed the Chicamocha river.

The main highway which connects Tipacoque with Bogotá and the east of Colombia is 174 km long, of which 150 km are paved (87%).

Trivia 
 The novel Tipacoque: Estampas de provincia (1971) by Eduardo Caballero Calderón describes the Colombian society in this region of Boyacá

Gallery

References 

Municipalities of Boyacá Department
Populated places established in 1968
1968 establishments in Colombia
Muisca Confederation
Muysccubun